Olds is a city in Henry County, Iowa, United States. The population was 192 at the time of the 2020 census.

Geography
Olds is located at  (41.133346, -91.545595).

Demographics

2010 census
As of the census of 2010, there were 229 people, 93 households, and 64 families living in the city. The racial makeup of the city was 96.1% White, 0.4% African American, 1.7% Native American, 1.3% from other races, and 0.4% from two or more races. Hispanic or Latino of any race were 1.3% of the population.

There were 93 households, of which 35.5% had children under the age of 18 living with them, 51.6% were married couples living together, 11.8% had a female householder with no husband present, 5.4% had a male householder with no wife present, and 31.2% were non-families. 28.0% of all households were made up of individuals, and 5.4% had someone living alone who was 65 years of age or older. The average household size was 2.46 and the average family size was 2.92.

The median age in the city was 37.5 years. 29.3% of residents were under the age of 18; 7.4% were between the ages of 18 and 24; 24% were from 25 to 44; 24% were from 45 to 64; and 15.3% were 65 years of age or older. The gender makeup of the city was 53.3% male and 46.7% female.

2000 census
As of the census of 2000, there were 249 people, 102 households, and 73 families living in the city. The racial makeup of the city was 95.98% White, 0.80% African American, 1.61% Native American, 0.80% from other races, and 0.80% from two or more races. Hispanic or Latino of any race were 2.01% of the population.

There were 102 households, out of which 40.2% had children under the age of 18 living with them, 56.9% were married couples living together, 9.8% had a female householder with no husband present, and 28.4% were non-families. 25.5% of all households were made up of individuals, and 12.7% had someone living alone who was 65 years of age or older. The average household size was 2.44 and the average family size was 2.86.

In the city, the population was spread out, with 30.5% under the age of 18, 10.0% from 18 to 24, 31.7% from 25 to 44, 16.5% from 45 to 64, and 11.2% who were 65 years of age or older. The median age was 31 years. For every 100 females, there were 91.5 males. For every 100 females age 18 and over, there were 86.0 males.

The median income for a household in the city was $31,875, and the median income for a family was $35,250. Males had a median income of $26,875 versus $20,694 for females. The per capita income for the city was $13,760. About 9.2% of families and 9.0% of the population were below the poverty line, including 5.8% of those under the age of eighteen and none of those 65 or over.

Education
WACO Community School District operates local public schools.

References

Cities in Henry County, Iowa
Cities in Iowa